Grand Rapids Civic Theatre & School of Theatre Arts, located in Grand Rapids, Michigan, was founded in 1925 and has grown into one of the largest community theatres in the United States.  Grand Rapids Civic Theatre & School of Theatre Arts is located in downtown Grand Rapids in an  facility consisting of four historic buildings: the Majestic Theatre (1903); the Hull Building (1890); the Botsford Building (1892); and the Wenham Building (1878).

The Theatre is in the process of a major capital and endowment growth project. In 2006, a major renovation of the facility led and managed by Grand Action invested over 10 million dollars in the Theatre’s four historic buildings. In the fall of 2006, Civic Theatre’s artistic home was renamed the Meijer Majestic Theatre in honor of Fred and Lena Meijer’s lead gift to this project. Civic Theatre is completing the project with a 2.3 million dollar endowment and theatrical equipment campaign. 

Each year, Civic Theatre creates over a dozen productions and over 15,000 hours of educational instruction. These programs are made possible by over 700 volunteers under the leadership of 9 professional staff and over 30 guest artists.

External links
 Grand Rapids Civic Theatre & School of Theatre Arts

Theatres in Michigan
Buildings and structures in Grand Rapids, Michigan
Education in Kent County, Michigan
Tourist attractions in Grand Rapids, Michigan
Event venues established in 1925